Arturia africana is a species of calcareous sponge from South Africa.

Description
Cormus formed of thin, irregular and loosely anastomosed tubes. No water-collecting tubes have been observed. Cells with granules have also not been observed. The skeleton has no special organisation, comprising equiangular and equiradiate triactines and tetractines. Actines are conical, slightly undulated at the distal part, and with a sharp tip. The apical actine of the tetractines is shorter, smooth, conical, straight and sharp, and is always projected into the tubes.

References

africana
Animals described in 2003
Fauna of South Africa